Jacqueline M. Hawkins (née Sinfield; born 1945) is an English book author and illustrator. She is known for her creative partnership with her husband Colin Hawkins, with whom she has illustrated and written over 150 children's books. They are the parents of actress Sally Hawkins.

Personal life
She was born Jacqueline M. Sinfield in Oxford, the daughter of Anne (née Carey) and John Sinfield. She married Colin Hawkins (b.1945) in 1968. She had known him as a child, as their families were acquainted with each other. She has Irish Catholic roots and would go to Ireland to visit her grandparents. They began dating in their late teens. Colin attended Blackpool Art School and then worked at the Daily Express. After working as freelancers and art instructors, they decided to form a partnership and began illustrating together. They have two children, two time Academy Award-nominee actress Sally Cecilia Hawkins (born 1976), and Finbar Hawkins (born 1970), a producer.

She studied graphic design at Goldsmiths College.

Career
The Hawkins' books have been published worldwide and in a variety of languages. They created The Numberlies book series, for children learning to count; and the Foxy book series, featuring the adventures of Foxy the Fox. The Foxy series was adapted into a cartoon series for television in the 1990s; there are also interactive mobile apps available for some of their books.

Select works

Witches (1981)
Adding Animals (1983)
Pat the Cat (1983)
Mig the Pig (1984)
Jen the Hen (1985)
Tog the Dog (1986)
Zug the Bug (1988)
Terrible, Terrible, Tiger (1987)
The Wizard's Cat (1987)
I'm Not Sleepy (1985)
One, Two, Guess Who? (2001)
Crocodile Creek (1988)
Noah Built an Ark One Day (1989)
Mr. Bear's Plane (1989)
When I Was One (1990)
The House that Jack Built (1990)
Knock! Knock! (1990)
Cosmic Cat and the Pink Planet (1988)
Cosmic Cat and the Space Spider (1988)
Foxy and the Spots (1995)
Foxy Goes to Bed (1995)
Foxy in the Kitchen (1995)
Foxy Loses His Tail (1995)
Foxy Plays Hide and Seek (1995)
Foxy and His Naughty Little Sister (1997)
Foxy and Friends Go Racing (1998)
Foxy Bakes Some Cakes (1998)
Foxy Feels Unwell (2001)
What's the Time, Mr. Wolf? (1983)
Mr. Wolf's Week (1985)
Mr. Wolf's Birthday Surprise (1987)
Mr. Wolf's Sticker Ticker Time (1997)
Mr. Wolf's Nursery Time (2005)
Greedy Goat (1999)
Daft Dog (1999)
Crazy Cow (2000)
Rude Rabbit (2000)
Bad Bear (2001)
Happy Horse (2001)
Hungry Baby (2003)
Playful Baby (2004)
Sleepy Baby (2004)
Soapy Baby (2004)
Bruno and the New Plane (2003)
Bruno and the Old Car (2003)
Pirates Joke Book (2001)
Vampires Joke Book (2001)
Aliens Joke Book (2001)
Pirate's Log: The Diary of Captain Ben Blunder (2001)
Alien Diaries: Zorb Zork (2001)
How to Look After Your Hamster (1995)
How to Look After Your Cat (1982)
How to Look After Your Rabbit (1995)
How to Look After Your Dog (1991)
Here's a Happy Pig (1988)
Here's a Happy Elephant (1987)
Here's a Happy Kitten (1996)
Here's a Happy Puppy (1996)
The Monsters Go on a Picnic (1984)
The Monsters Visit Granny (1984)

References

1945 births
Living people
British women illustrators
British children's book illustrators
English illustrators
British children's writers
British women children's writers
20th-century English women writers
20th-century English writers
21st-century English women writers
Artists from Oxford
British people of Irish descent
Alumni of Goldsmiths, University of London